Vette is a German language surname. Notable people with the name include:
 Clayton Vette (1988), American professional basketball player
 Gordon Vette (1933–2015), New Zealand airline captain
 Vicky Vette (1965), Norwegian-Canadian pornographic actress

German-language surnames